Cameroneta is a monotypic genus of Central African dwarf spiders containing the single species, Cameroneta longiradix. It was first described by R. Bosmans & R. Jocqué in 1983, and has only been found in Cameroon.

See also
 List of Linyphiidae species

References

Linyphiidae
Monotypic Araneomorphae genera
Spiders of Africa